Sardar Patel Mahavidyalaya, Chandrapur (SPM), better known as S P College is an college located in Chandrapur, Maharashtra, India. The college was established in 1970 by late Shri Shantaram Potdukhe. It is managed by the Sarvodaya Shikshan Sanstha , Chandrapur. It is affiliated to Gondwana University Gadchiroli.

Awards 

 RE ACCREDITED AT 'A' GRADE BY NAAC
 Best College Award by Gondwana University

Faculties and Departments

Faculties 

 Arts 
 Commerce
 Science
 Computer Science

Courses 

 B.A., B.Com, B.Sc., B.C.A., B.C.C.A., B.F.D., B.Com.(CA), B.Sc.(IT),
 M.A.(Eng., Mar., Hin., Pol.Sci., Soc, His, H.Eco., Geo., Mass Communication
 M.Sc. (Phy, Che, Maths, Env. Sci, Zoo, Bio-Tech, Comp.Sci., Micro Biology, Biotechnology)
 M.Com. I, II, M.Phil (Com.),
 M.C.A., M.F.D., P.G.D.C.S.
 B.Lib., C.Lib., M.Lib.

Junior College 

 Arts
 Commerce
 Science
 Vocational
 MCVC

Activists

About 
This was made possible only by the guidance of Shantaram Podukhe. hardworking teaching staff, dedicated support staff and enthusiastic college students. It will now be recognized as an institution of academic excellence and accomplishment. It is one of the best colleges in the university.

See also 
 List of Universities in India
 Gondwana University

References

External links 

 Official website

Colleges in India
1970 establishments in Maharashtra
Educational institutions established in 1970